The Hiawatha Athletics were a minor league baseball team based in Hiawatha, Kansas in 1912. The Athletics played as members of the Class D level Missouri-Iowa-Nebraska-Kansas League. In 1910, the Hiawatha Indians played as a member of the Eastern Kansas League. Both Hiawatha teams played home games at League Park.

History
Minor league baseball play began in Hiawatha, Kansas in 1910. The Hiawatha Indians played as charter members of the six–team Class D level Eastern Kansas League. The 1910 team was also referred to as the "Boosters." The Seneca, Sabatha, Holton, Horton Hammers and Marysville teams joined Hiawatha in league play. After beginning league play on June 8, 1910, Hiawatha ended their 1910 season with a record of 44–44 to place 3rd in the Eastern Kansas League standings, playing under managers Spec Willey, Swift and Pepper Williford. Hiawatha finished 12.5 games behind the 1st place Sabetha team in the six–team league. The Eastern Kansas League permanently folded after their only season in 1910.

Minor league baseball returned to Hiawatha in 1912, with the team finishing last in the standings. The 1912 Hiawatha Athletics began play as members of the Class D level Missouri-Iowa-Nebraska-Kansas League, known informally as the MINK League. On July 4, 1912, Falls City Colts pitcher Ed Finch threw the Missouri-Iowa-Nebraska-Kansas League's only no–hitter in a 7–0 Falls City victory over the Hiawatha Athletics. The Athletics ended the 1912 season with a record of 35–66, placing 6th in the six–team MINK standings. Hiawatha finished 27.0 games behind the champion Falls City Colts. The Athletics played under managers Robert Kahl and Jack Forester. The Hiawatha franchise permanently folded after the 1912 season as the Missouri-Illinois-Nebraska-Kansas League reduced to four teams for their final season in 1913. The Beatrice-Fairbury Milkskimmers also folded following the 1912 season.

Hiawatha, Kansas has not hosted another minor league team.

The ballpark
The 1910 and 1912 Hiawatha teams played minor league home games at League Park in Hiawatha, Kansas. The location of League Park is unknown.

Timeline

Year–by–year records

Notable alumni
Clifton Marr (1912)

References

External links
Baseball ReferenceHiawatha Ballpark photo 1915

Defunct minor league baseball teams
Professional baseball teams in Kansas
Defunct baseball teams in Kansas
Baseball teams established in 1910
Baseball teams disestablished in 1912
Missouri-Iowa-Nebraska-Kansas League (minor league) teams
Brown County, Kansas
1910 establishments in Kansas
1912 disestablishments in Kansas